UNIDROIT (formally, the International Institute for the Unification of Private Law; French: Institut international pour l'unification du droit privé) is an intergovernmental organization whose objective is to harmonize international private law across countries through uniform rules, international conventions, and the production of model laws, sets of principles, guides and guidelines. Established in 1926 as part of the League of Nations, it was reestablished in 1940 following the League's dissolution through a multilateral agreement, the UNIDROIT Statute. As of 2019 UNIDROIT has 63 member states.

UNIDROIT has prepared multiple conventions (treaties), but has also developed soft law instruments. An example are the UNIDROIT Principles of International Commercial Contracts. Distinctly different from the Convention on the International Sale of Goods (CISG) adopted by UNCITRAL, the UNIDROIT Principles do not apply as a matter of law, but only when chosen by the parties as their contractual regime.

Seat
The seat of UNIDROIT is in Rome, Italy, between via Nazionale and via Panisperna, occupying the Villa Aldobrandini, a 17th-century princely villa that borders the Pontifical University of Saint Thomas Aquinas, Angelicum, to the south.

Membership

States become members through acceding to its statute. The 63 members are:

Ecuador was a member State of UNIDROIT from 1940 to 1964; Lebanon was a member State of UNIDROIT from 1958 to 1964 and Senegal was a member State from 1991 to 1997. Countries which have ceased to exist are former member states: Czechoslovakia, East Germany, United Arab Republic, and Yugoslavia.

Conventions
Unidroit has over the years prepared the following international Conventions, drawn up by Unidroit and adopted by diplomatic Conferences convened by member States of Unidroit:
Convention relating to a Uniform Law on the International Sale of Goods (The Hague, 1964)
Convention relating to a Uniform Law on the Formation of Contracts for the International Sale of Goods (The Hague, 1964)
International Convention on Travel Contracts (Brussels, 1970)
Convention providing a Uniform Law on the Form of an International Will (Washington, D.C., 1973)
Convention on Agency in the International Sale of Goods (Geneva, 1983)
UNIDROIT Convention on International Financial Leasing (Ottawa, 1988)
UNIDROIT Convention on International Factoring (Ottawa, 1988)
UNIDROIT Convention on Stolen or Illegally Exported Cultural Objects (Rome, 1995)
Convention on International Interests in Mobile Equipment (Cape Town, 2001) (including Protocols on Aircraft (2001) and Railway Rolling Stock (2007) and Space Assets (2012))
Geneva Securities Convention (Geneva, 2009)

UNIDROIT is depositary of two of its conventions: the Cape Town Convention (including its three protocols) as well as the Geneva Securities Convention.

For many years UNIDROIT prepared the background studies for international conventions that were subsequently finalized by other international organisations. To be noted among these, are the Convention on the Contract for the International Carriage of Goods by Road (CMR), finalized by the UN Economic Commission for Europe in 1956, and the United Nations Convention on the Liability of Operators of Transport Terminals in International Trade finalized by UNCITRAL in 1991.

In addition, UNIDROIT has adopted the 2002 Model Franchise Disclosure Law; the 2008 Model Law on Leasing; and the 2011 Model Provisions on State Ownership of Undiscovered Cultural Objects (in co-operation with UNESCO); and published the UNIDROIT Principles of International Commercial Contracts (1994, 2004, 2010 and 2016); the Model Clauses for Use by Parties of the UNIDROIT Principles of International Commercial Contracts (2013); the ALI / UNIDROIT Principles of Transnational Civil Procedure (in co-operation with the American Law Institute) (2004); the Principles on the Operation of Close-Out Netting Provisions (2013); the Guide to International Master Franchise Arrangements (1998, second edition 2007), and the UNIDROIT/FAO/IFAD Legal Guide on Contract Farming (2015).

References

External links
Unidroit official website

Legal research institutes
International universities
Intergovernmental organizations established by treaty
Conflict of laws
Securities (finance)
League of Nations
Organizations established in 1926
Private law
 
Organisations based in Rome